Madrasas of Tunis were built under the reign of the Hafsid dynasty in the medina of Tunis.

The original plan was that those schools would contribute to educate the state civil servants. In the 20th century, their role is limited to hosting students of the University of Ez-Zitouna.

List 
 Madrasa Al Habibia Al Kubra
 Madrasa Al Habibia Al Sughra
 Madrasa Al Husseiniya Al Kubra
 Madrasa Al Husseiniya Al Sughra
 Madrasa Al Jassoussia
 Madrasa Al Khaldounia
 Madrasa Asfouria
 Madrasa Andaloussiya
 Madrasa Ibn Tafargine
 Madrasa Bir Lahjar
 Madrasa El Jemaa Al Jedid
 Madrasa Ech Chamaiya
 Madrasa El Achouria
 Madrasa El Bachia
 Madrasa El Maghribia
 Madrasa El Mountaciriya
 Madrasa El Mtaychia
 Madrasa El Tawfikia
 Madrasa El Unqiya
 Madrasa El Yusefiya
 Madrasa Ennakhla
 Madrasa Hamzia
 Madrasa Hwanit Achour
 Madrasa Marjania
 Madrasa Mouradiyya
 Madrasa Salhia
 Madrasa Slimania
 Madrasa Saheb Ettabaâ